Toni Stricker (4 April 1930 – 16 February 2022) was an Austrian composer and violinist. He died on 16 February 2022, at the age of 91.

References

External links

 

1930 births
2022 deaths
Austrian composers
Austrian violinists
Austrian film score composers
Recipients of the Austrian Cross of Honour for Science and Art
Musicians from Vienna